The 1987 Australian Production Car Championship was an Australian motor racing competition open to Group E Series Production Cars. The championship was contested over two 30 lap, 60 km heats staged at the Winton circuit in Victoria, Australia on 27 September 1987. The championship winner was determined by a pointscore system which awarded the first twenty placegetters in each heat. The championship was organised by the Benalla Auto Club.

The title, which was recognised by the Confederation of Australian Motor Sport as the first Australian Production Car Championship, was won by Peter Fitzgerald driving a Mitsubishi Starion.

Championship results

Notes
 Number of competitors: 53
 Number of competitors selected for the championship: 30
 Fastest lap in Heat 1: 1m 12.14s, Gary Waldon, (Mazda RX-7), (new lap record)
 Fastest lap in Heat 2: 1m 12.22s, Peter Fitzgerald, (Mitsubishi Starion),

Championship name
The terms Australian Production Car Championship,  Australian Series Production Championship and Australian Production Touring Car Championship have been used in relation to this competition. The name Australian Production Car Championship was used by the Confederation of Australian Motor Sport and has been used here.

References

Australian Production Car Championship
Production